''Mahabo (Ambohidratrimo) is a town and commune in Madagascar. It belongs to the district of Ambohidratrimo (district), which is a part of Analamanga Region.

It is situated at 48 km nort-west of the capital Antananarivo at the  national road 4. The population of the commune was estimated to be approximately 6,994 in 2018.

References and notes 

Monographie Region Analamanga

Populated places in Analamanga